Cidades e Lendas is the thirteenth solo album by Brazilian musician Zé Ramalho. It was released in 1996, after another four-year gap with no albums. It was released in a show at TUCA, São Paulo, around the time when his hit "Admirável Gado Novo" was featured at the soundtrack of Rede Globo's telenovela O Rei do Gado. When comparing this work with his previous effort, Frevoador, Ramalho said he was more satisfied this time because he had more time "to choose the best repertoire and invite the right people".

By the end of October 1998, it had sold 50,000 copies.

Track listing

Personnel 
According to his official website
 Zé Ramalho - Acoustic guitar, Lead vocals
 Manassés - Electric guitar, Twelve-string viola on tracks 1, 3, 10, Viola on tracks 2, 5, 6, 8, 9
 Chico Guedes - Bass guitar on tracks 1, 2, 5, 8, 9
 Jorjão - Bass guitar on tracks 3, 6, 10
 Rui Motta - Drums on track 1
 Gustavo Schröeter - Drums on tracks 2, 5
 Fernando Pereira - Drums on tracks 3, 10
 Sivuca - Arrangement and Conducting on tracks 1, 2, 3, 5, 8, 9, accordion on tracks 6, 8, 10
 Zé Gomes - Percussion on tracks 1, 2, 4, 5, 6 Zabumba on tracks 3, 8, 9, 10
 Zé Leal - Percussion on tracks 1, 2, 3, 5, 6, 8, 9, Pandeiro on track 10
 Marcos Nobile - Piano on tracks 1, 2, 3, 5, 8, 9
 Fernando Moura - Programming on tracks 4, 8, 11
 Julhinho Teixeira - Programming on track 7

Notes

References 

1996 albums
Bertelsmann Music Group albums
RCA Records albums
Zé Ramalho albums